Acleris hapalactis is a species of moth of the family Tortricidae. It is found in India (Assam).

The wingspan is 15–16 mm. The forewings are light yellow-ochreous, with a few scattered minute black tufts. The veins are marked with fine fuscous lines on the posterior half. There is also a faint triangular patch of ferruginous-ochreous suffusion on the costa and a ferruginous-ochreous terminal fascia. The hindwings are light grey. Adults have been recorded on wing in July.

References

Moths described in 1912
hapalactis
Moths of Asia